1970 in the Philippines details events of note that happened in the Philippines in the year 1970.

Incumbents

 President: Ferdinand Marcos (Nacionalista Party)
 Vice President: Fernando Lopez (Nacionalista Party)
House Speaker: José Laurel, Jr.
 Chief Justice: Roberto Concepcion
 Congress: 7th (starting January 26)

Events

January
 January to March – The First Quarter Storm was a period of leftist unrest in the Philippines, composed of a series of heavy demonstrations, protests, and marches against the government.
 January 26 – Pres. Marcos delivers his State of the Nation Address at the Legislative Building, Manila. Student groups, led by the National Union of Students of the Philippines and Kabataang Makabayan, conducts a rally outside the building, in which, are confronted by the riot police as they march to Malacañang, leaving many injuries.
 January 30 – Another confrontation between riot police and about 2,000 demonstrators, mostly students, outside the Malacañang Palace, kills six people in what would be called the "Battle of Mendiola," and marks the beginning of the First Quarter Storm.

February
 February 18 – United States Embassy in Manila is attacked by an estimated 2,000-3,000 youths, who had broken from a massive peaceful demonstrations, after holding a People's Congress in Plaza Miranda.

March
 March 3 – A People's March is organized by the Movement for a Democratic Philippines, and the group marches from Welcome Rotonda in Quezon City to Post Office Building in Plaza Lawton, Manila.

April
 April 5 – 7 – Demonstrations and strikes against oil price and transportation cost increases, and violent anti-American riots break out.
 April 7 – Destructive earthquake shook the Manila area, killed 15 persons and injured 200 others.
 April 21 – Philippine twin-engine Hawker Siddeley, ripped by an explosion in the tail section, fell near the village of Pantabangan, Nueva Ecija, all 36 aboard died.

May
 May 20 – Another protest actions against Marcos government and the involvement of United States in Vietnam War are held.

June
 June 12 – Philippine fishing boat "Baby Princess" capsized in a violent storm 300 miles southwest of Manila, 22 persons were rescued, 22 others were devoured by sharks.

October
 October 13 – Super Typhoon Sening landfalls on Lagonoy Gulf with sustained winds of 280 km/h. Sening left over 80,000 people homeless, in addition to killing 575 people (193 people were unaccounted for, and have since been declared dead, bringing the total toll to 768) and injuring nearly 1600. US$74 million (1970 US$, $373 million 2005 USD) of damage was estimated.

November
 November 10 – The Constitutional Convention was called to change the existing Philippine Constitution which was made during the Commonwealth of the Philippines. Special elections for the CON-CON Delegates who will represent the various provinces of the country were held. From among more than 2,000 candidates, 320 delegates are elected.
 November 19 – Philippine military officials denied charges made by Senator Stuart Symington (Democratic; Missouri) that the United States had provided cash assistance to the Philippine contingent in Vietnam.
 November 20 – Violent typhoon (Typhoon Patsy or Yoling) with winds of (more than) 125 mph raged through the heavily populated (Luzon) island, wrecking the harbor and airport facilities at Manila. Typhoon Patsy was one of the deadliest typhoons to strike the Philippines in its history. 611 people were killed (with 351 missing) on the island, and 135 people were killed at sea due to shipping failures. In Manila, 120 persons died, 60 others were missing, and more than 1,000 injured; property damage reached $80 million.
 November 27–29 – Papal visit of Pope Paul VI, the country's first. Upon his arrival at Manila International Airport, he survived an assassination attempt by a Bolivian painter, Benjamin Mendoza (a knife-wielding assailant dressed as a priest).

December
 December 29 – The New People's Army conducts a raid in the armory of the Philippine Military Academy, with Lt. Victor Corpuz, academy's constabulary officer, as its accomplice.

Holidays

As per Act No. 2711 section 29, issued on March 10, 1917, any legal holiday of fixed date falls on Sunday, the next succeeding day shall be observed as legal holiday. Sundays are also considered legal religious holidays. Bonifacio Day was added through Philippine Legislature Act No. 2946. It was signed by then-Governor General Francis Burton Harrison in 1921. On October 28, 1931, the Act No. 3827 was approved declaring the last Sunday of August as National Heroes Day. As per Republic Act No. 3022, April 9 is proclaimed as Bataan Day. Independence Day was changed from July 4 (Philippine Republic Day) to June 12 (Philippine Independence Day) on August 4, 1964.

 January 1 – New Year's Day
 February 22 – Legal Holiday
 March 27 – Maundy Thursday
 March 28 – Good Friday
 April 9 – Araw ng Kagitingan (Day of Valor)
 May 1 – Labor Day
 June 12 – Independence Day 
 July 4 – Philippine Republic Day
 August 13  – Legal Holiday
 August 30  – National Heroes Day
 November 26 – Thanksgiving Day
 November 30 – Bonifacio Day
 December 25 – Christmas Day
 December 30 – Rizal Day

Entertainment and culture
 June 1 - NewsWatch, the longest-running newscast premiered on KBS-9 (now RPN-9 until 2012).

Unknown
 Sesame Street, premiered on KBS-9 (now RPN-9 until 1980).

Sports
 August 24 – September 4 – The country participated in the 1970 Asian Games held in Bangkok, Thailand. It ranked 11th with 1 gold medal, 9 silver medals and 12 bronze medals with a total of 22 over-all medals.

Births

January 2 – Ogie Diaz, actor, comedian, and talent manager
January 5 – Mitoy Yonting, singer and comedian
January 8 – Bentot Jr., actor (died 2016)
January 11 – Joy Nilo, composer
January 12 – Mig Ayesa, Filipino-Australian singer and actor
January 23 – Ronald Moreno, judge
January 28:
Norman Fegidero, football player
February 1:
 Albert Garcia, politician
 Michael Teruel, olympian
February 14 – John Carlos de los Reyes, politician
February 25 – Maricel Laxa, actress
March 2 – Strike Revilla, politician
March 6 – Gretchen Barretto, actress
March 15 – Joy Belmonte, politician
March 20 – Josephine Medina, table tennis player (died 2021)
March 21 – Jaya, Filipino soul music, singer, rapper, dancer, record producer, TV host, and actress
March 27 – E.J. Feihl, basketball player
March 30 – Isidro Vicera, boxer
April 3 – Ace Durano, politician
April 6 – Angelica Amante, politician
April 9 – Bing Loyzaga, actress and singer
April 12 – Eric Buhain, competitive swimmer
April 16 – Angelica Amante, politician
April 17 – Carlo Katigbak, president and CEO of ABS-CBN Corporation
April 22 – Regine Velasquez, singer and actress
May 1 – Cristina Gonzales, actress and politician
May 2 – Warren Kiamco, professional pool player
May 4 – Monique Wilson, actress and women's rights activist
May 6 – Dennis Pineda, politician
May 15:
Elias Bulut Jr., politician
Elias Recaido, boxer
May 27 – Cherry Pie Picache, actress
May 30 – Manolo Quezon, writer and host
June 6 – Johnedel Cardel, professional basketball player
June 10 – Alex Santos, journalist
June 11 – Pinky Webb, TV newscaster
July 3 – Niel Tupas Jr., lawyer and politician
July 17 – Johnny Abarrientos, basketball player
July 20 – Anjanette Abayari, actress
July 30 – Ferdinand Pascual, basketball referee
July 31 – Robert Angelo, professional tennis player
August 2 – Marcelino Teodoro, politician
August 6 – Rex Andrew Alarcon, Bishop of Daet
August 7 – Gerardo Espina Jr., politician
August 27 – Pokwang, comedian
August 30 – Ricor Buaron, basketball referee
September 5 – Gilbert Remulla, journalist and politician
September 24 – Keanna Reeves, comedian
October 2 – Adel Tamano, educator, lawyer and politician
October 5 – Geraldine Ecleo-Villaroman, politician
October 28 – Alan Peter Cayetano, politician, diplomat, and Speaker of the House of Representatives
October 30 – Christine Bersola-Babao, host
November 1 – Olsen Racela, basketball player
November 2 – Ely Buendia, vocalist of Eraserheads
November 21 – Karen Davila, TV newscaster
November 24 – Tonisito Umali, lawyer 
November 25 – Vince Hizon, basketball player
December 26 – Antonio Lascuña, professional golfer

Deaths
January 2 – Boni Serrano, soldier
January 19 – Honoria Acosta-Sison, first female Filipino doctor
January 26 – Basilio J. Valdes, Spanish-Filipino doctor, general, and minister
March 24 – Amado V. Hernandez, writer and labor leader
March 26 – Sulpicio Osório, editor, poet and writer
April 20 – Antonio Abad, poet and playwright
April 21 – José Corazón de Jesús Jr., actor
June 23 – Fortunato Yambao, basketball player
July 18 – Basilio L. Sarmiento, poet
August 11:
Carlos Camins, politician
Leon C. Pichay, writer and poet
Rudy Robles, actor
September 8 – Mariano Castañeda, 5th Chief of Staff of the Armed Forces of the Philippines
October 18 – Manuel A. Cuenco, physician and politician
December 22 – Vicente Gullas, writer, lawyer and educator

References